Kahrizeh-ye Mahmud Aqa (also Romanized as Kahrīzeh-ye Maḩmūd Āqā; also known as Kahrīzeh-ye Maḩmūdābād) is a village in Akhtachi Rural District of the Central District of Bukan County, West Azerbaijan province, Iran. At the 2006 National Census, its population was 1,187 in 247 households. The following census in 2011 counted 2,955 people in 778 households. The latest census in 2016 showed a population of 4,058 people in 1,144 households; it was the largest village in its rural district.

References 

Bukan County

Populated places in West Azerbaijan Province

Populated places in Bukan County